Julie Anne Donaldson (born February 10, 1978) is an American sportscaster and media producer for the Washington Commanders of the National Football League (NFL). Prior to that, she served as an anchor, host, and reporter for several television networks, and also won the 2001 Miss Florida USA beauty pageant. Donaldson became the first full-time on-air female member of an NFL broadcasting team upon her hiring by Washington in 2020.

Career
Donaldson was born in Jacksonville, Florida on February 10, 1978. She won the Miss Florida USA title at the state pageant held in Orlando, Florida in July 2000. She had previously placed first runner-up to Kristin Ludecke in the previous year's pageant. Donaldson competed in the Miss USA 2001 pageant won by Kandace Krueger of Texas, but did not place. In July 2001, she passed on her title to Shannon Ford.

In 2006, Donaldson joined SportsNet New York at the network's inception. She made numerous reports from various sporting events covered by SNY and hosted Mets Weekly, a weekly program recapping New York Mets games, trades, injuries, and other features. She spent two years working for the network from 2006-2007. Donaldson worked as a TV host for Miami Heat's Heat TV. Prior to that, Donaldson co-hosted Sports Rap on Fox Sports Net Florida. Donaldson also co-hosted Softball 360 and the PBS series Healthy Body Healthy Mind.

In February 2008, Donaldson was hired to cover Boston-based sports for NBC affiliate WHDH-TV. She left the job in December 2008, seeking a start in a new market. In June 2010, Donaldson was employed as a freelance reporter for Comcast SportsNet's mid-atlantic network, covering sports stories in the Washington, D.C. area. Donaldson was promoted to anchor in September 2010. During her decade-long tenure as a reporter, anchor, and host for NBC Sports Washington, Donaldson covered nearly every team, athlete and major sports story in the region, as well as across national and international sporting events. Donaldson also served as host of several NFL shows and contributed regularly to their other football programs and coverage. In addition to her work with NBC Sports, Donaldson also frequently held on-air roles for NBC Olympic broadcasts. She held four Olympic assignments as a news host during the Olympic Games in the 2010s.

In July 2020, Donaldson joined the Washington Commanders to be their senior vice president of media and as one of its gameday radio broadcasters, working alongside play by play announcer Bram Weinstein and analyst DeAngelo Hall. She was the first hired female on-air member of an NFL broadcast team and was named as one of the most powerful and influential women in sports by Sports Illustrated in late 2020.

Domestic assault
In July 2008, Donaldson testified in a Boston Municipal Court hearing that she and two female guests had been assaulted at her apartment on June 27 by her then boyfriend Ivan Lattimore, a professional Slamball player for the Rumble. Lattimore, who was arrested after an incident the previous month and charged with three counts of assault and battery and one count of indecent assault, was ordered to be held without bail until his trial in September, where he pled guilty to the assault charges and was sentenced to serve a year in jail before being sentenced to another year for sending letters to Donaldson after his conviction. Lattimore had a prior criminal record with at least two other domestic violence convictions.

In October 2009, Donaldson spoke out for the first time on her own terms about her own personal experience with domestic abuse. Taking part in both the 15th Annual Barbara Ann Campbell Memorial Breakfast for Hubbard House and the Take Back the Night Walk at the University of North Florida, Donaldson shared her message of hope. Donaldson returned to Ponte Vedra Beach after leaving the Boston news station in November of the previous year. She found refuge in her family and from Hubbard House in Jacksonville. In June 2010, Donaldson relocated to Washington, D.C., to work as an anchor and reporter for Comcast SportsNet's daily half-hour news program SportsNite. She left Ponte Vedra in June to freelance and was officially offered the position at Comcast in August.

References

External links
Washington Football Team bio

University of Florida alumni
Living people
Miss USA 2001 delegates
People from Jacksonville, Florida
1978 births
American beauty pageant winners
American radio sports announcers
American women journalists
American women sportswriters
American women television presenters
American television reporters and correspondents
American television sports anchors
National Football League announcers
Washington Football Team executives
Television anchors from Jacksonville, Florida
American television sports announcers
Washington Football Team announcers
Washington Commanders announcers